An electronic daily devotional is inspirational Christian, Bible-based material that can be delivered through a variety of channels. Unlike Bible software that is designed for in-depth Bible study, daily devotionals in electronic form are designed to focus the mind on one or two thoughts.

History 
Devotional classics such as Oswald Chambers' My Utmost for His Highest went electronic as a part of Bible software book collections when Bible software emerged in the 1980s in response to the capabilities of personal computers. These early versions were awkward to scroll through. The emergence of the internet in the 1990s prompted an explosion of online daily devotional offerings. With the advent of cell phones, iPods and smart phones, mobile delivery of daily devotionals has changed even more.

Software-based devotionals 
The same electronic publishers that brought Bible software to desktop users—e-Sword, LOGOS, Pradis, PC Study Bible, Online Bible, and QuickVerse, among others, also include devotional classics in electronic media. These devotional materials are tied to the user's computer.

Online devotionals 
Our Daily Bread was among the earliest of the classic devotionals to appear on the Internet. Online archives of the devotional are available back to January 1994.   Upper Room Ministries began emailing the Upper Room daily devotional guide in 1997.   In the years following, many Christian organizations began adding a daily devotional to their website. The following is an incomplete list of daily devotional services available through recognized Christian organizations.
 Campus Crusade for Christ
 Crosswalk.com
 Grace to You
 Lutheran Hour Ministries
 Moody Bible Institute
 Purpose Driven Life

Mobile devotionals 
Many of the web-based devotional providers offer mobile delivery of their electronic devotionals. The most popular method of delivery remains email which is accessible through internet capable mobile phones as well as computers. Some organizations offer RSS feeds. All of these mobile options require connection to the internet.

A number of devotional providers also offer a daily devotional in text-message format appropriate for any cell phone with text capability. Internet service is not required. Many providers offer this service for free while some charge a monthly fee. Of the fee-based service providers, a small number, such as The Bible Now, use the monthly fee to support other faith-based initiatives, including Christian adoption (such as the Aspen Project) and short-term missions to Mexico (Casa por Cristo).

Christian media
Christian Bible